During the 30 June Stadium stampede, 28 football fans died on 8 February 2015 in a confrontation with the police at the gates of 30 June Stadium during a league match between two Cairo clubs, Zamalek and ENPPI. Most of the dead were crushed to death and suffocated when the crowd stampeded after police used tear gas to clear the fans trying to force their way into the stadium. Egypt's hardcore fans are notorious for violent behavior at matches, and Egypt has designated some as terrorist groups.

Reactions

Domestic
 The Cabinet of Egypt decided to stop the league for an indefinite period.

International
 FIFA – FIFA president Sepp Blatter sent a letter to Mohamed Gamal, the President of the Egyptian Football Association, in which he expressed his sorrow for the occurrence of a number of victims as a result of events before the game.
This stampede is still in court and being investigated.

See also
 Port Said Stadium riot
 Zamalek disaster

References

2015 in Egypt
Man-made disasters in Egypt
Stadium disasters
Human stampedes in 2015
2014–15 in Egyptian football
Riots and civil disorder in Egypt
2010s in Cairo
Football in Egypt
Association football riots
Association football hooliganism
February 2015 events in Egypt
2015 disasters in Egypt